The Oxford Capacity Analysis (OCA), also known as the American Personality Analysis, is a list of questions which is advertised as being a personality test and that is administered for free by the Church of Scientology.  The OCA test is offered by the Church of Scientology online, at its local churches, and sometimes at local fairs, carnivals, and in other public settings. It has no relation to the University of Oxford, although the name may have been chosen to imply so.

The test is an important part of Scientology recruitment and is used worldwide by the Church of Scientology to attract new members. However, it is not a scientifically recognized test and has been criticized by numerous psychology organizations, who point out that it is "not a genuine personality test" and allege that Scientologists use it in a "highly manipulative" and "manifestly unethical" fashion.

How the test works

Two hundred questions make up the Scientology personality test. Each can be answered yes, no, or maybe. Typical questions include:

3. Do you browse through railway timetables, directories or dictionaries just for pleasure?
6. Do you get occasional twitches of your muscles, when there is no logical reason for it?
27. Do you often sing or whistle just for the fun of it?
30. Do you enjoy telling people the latest scandal about your associates?
59. Do you consider the modern prisons without bars system "doomed to failure"?
69. Does emotional music have quite an effect on you?
105. Do you rarely suspect the actions of others?
124. Do you often make tactless blunders?
196. Do you sometimes feel that your age is against you (too young or too old)?

The OCA test is often given at the same time as a "Novis Mental Ability Test," a short 30 minute test which is claimed to measure IQ. After the two tests have been completed, a computer program is used to plot the results on a personality profile graph. This gives the testee's IQ rating and score in personality characteristics such as "Stable," "Happy," "Composed," "Certainty," "Active," "Aggressive," "Responsible (Causative)," "Correct Estimation" (meaning the testee's ability to look at a situation and determine what is needed to deal with it), "Appreciative," and "Comm[unication] Level" (meaning the testee's ability to communicate with others).

The scale on the graph of each trait ranges from +100 to −100, with three main bands marked "Desirable State" (+100 to +30), "Normal" (+30 to 0) and "Unacceptable State" (0 to −100). In the middle are two shaded bands, "Acceptable under perfect conditions" (about +32 to about +6) and "Attention Desirable" (about +6 to about −18). A legend at the foot of the graph sheet warns that a point below the latter band indicates "Attention Urgent."

After the graph has been plotted, a Scientology staff member reviews the results with the testee.

Role

Development

Even before the Church of Scientology had fashioned its own test, founder L. Ron Hubbard made personality tests central to his religion. In his 1951 book Science of Survival, he recommended the use of existing psychometric exams, including the California Test for Mental Maturity.

In the mid-1950s, the project to create Hubbard's own test got underway. He commissioned a longtime follower, Julia Salman Lewis, to produce one.  Her first effort, the American Personality Analysis (APA), failed to satisfy Hubbard. So in 1959 he asked a friend and fellow churchman, Ray Kemp, to broaden the scope of the test. Wrote Kemp:

The church first announced its test in an article by Kemp, who hailed the OCA in the pages of Certainty, the magazine of the Hubbard Association of Scientologists in London. Later, the church gave credit to Hubbard for the test and trademarked the terms "OCA" and "Oxford Capacity Analysis." The copyright holder is "L. Ron Hubbard Library," a business alias of the Religious Technology Center.

At first the church just tested its members, not the public. Then in 1960, a recruitment drive in Johannesburg, South Africa was run. The South African campaign had kicked off with a newspaper ad:

Respondents were tested in the Johannesburg Scientology office, having been told:

Hubbard proclaimed it "the hottest, fastest procurement service set up we have ever had." He announced that the new "Personal Efficiency Test Program," utilising the OCA, would be rolled out across Scientology in the next few months. Since then, OCA tests have been one of the most visible means by which the Church of Scientology attempts to attract new members.

Use within Scientology

The OCA is today used for two principal purposes. Within the Church of Scientology, it is used to test for improvement in the personality of a "preclear" (a novice Scientologist) and the effectiveness of the chosen Scientology "process". OCA evaluations are conducted regularly and recorded, following Hubbard's instructions:

The other use, more visible to non-Scientologists, is that of recruitment, using the OCA as a tool to attract new people for Scientology services.  In a 1960 policy letter, Hubbard wrote:

The results of the test are invariably negative, as various reporters have found:

Former Scientologists have spoken of how "everything that's wrong with [people]" is purposefully emphasized in OCA test results. Individuals who have undertaken the OCA have described how they were given just such negative evaluations; as one young Sydney woman put it in an interview in 1980,

Hubbard advised that the hopelessness of the testee's predicament (or "ruin," as he put it) should be emphasized by the tester, who should continually state that Scientology services are what is necessary for the situation to be salvaged:

The evaluator generally follows a script (Pre-written answers based on the test takers score.) originally devised by South African Scientologist Peter Greene around 1960/61, which Hubbard instructs "must be studied and learned by heart" by evaluators. Although the analysis is represented as being "not our opinion of you, but ... a factual scientific analysis taken from your answers," it relies heavily on scripted responses set out in detail in the "OCA Automatic Evaluation Script".

The evaluator is instructed to recommend Scientology as the only viable remedy for such problems. Alternatives are to be mentioned – "psychology, psychoanalysis, Dale Carnegie, Confidence Courses, Mental Exercises" – but only for the purpose of dismissing them: "these things had a very limited application and you could get yourself terribly involved in mysteries, expenses and wasted time, before you found any solutions to your difficulties.  All across the world today, people are coming to us, to find simpler, more straight forward answers."

The vehemence with which OCA test evaluators attempt to "impinge" has attracted comment from non-Scientologists who have undergone the test. Writing in 1970, a British psychologist who underwent the test noted that

If an IQ test is added to the regular OCA examination, Scientology is likewise promoted as being essential no matter what the results – for everything from raising a low IQ to managing a high IQ. Hubbard provides four levels of grading for this test, for each of which there is a scripted response:

Use outside Scientology

The OCA is licensed to Scientologist-owned companies through the World Institute of Scientology Enterprises. It has been used for a variety of purposes, most commonly employee screening.

Some Scientologist doctors use the test to evaluate patients. Los Angeles celebrity plastic surgeon Dr. Edward Terino rates his patients on a "Trouble Scale" after administering the test, which he markets to doctors via a company called Surgeon's Insight. Terino, a Scientologist, adopted the test after being threatened with injuries by a husband who hated Terino's nose-job work.

It has often been used without alteration, but has also been issued in modified versions; for instance, MasterTech markets the OCA with minor changes and calls it the Personnel Potential Analysis Test.

Criticism and controversy 

Psychologists have assailed the test's lack of scientific basis. Other critics call it intentionally manipulative and humiliating.

"The overall impression one gets [from the test manual]," said a psychologist testifying before a public inquiry into Scientology in Victoria, Australia in the mid-1960s, "is that it has been prepared by somebody with a smattering of psychometrics rather than by someone who is really competent in the field." A more detailed investigation was undertaken in 1970 by the British Psychological Society (BPS) at the request of politician Sir John Foster. The group's conclusions:

Another detailed evaluation was carried out in 1981 by Gudmund Smith, Professor Emeritus at the Institute of Psychology of the University of Lund, Sweden. This time the investigation was done for a prosecutor attacking a local branch of Narconon, the church's drug rehab offshoot. Smith cited numerous methodological and empirical flaws in the OCA, describing it as a "terrible mess," and concluded (in translation from the original Swedish):

The OCA also came under scrutiny in Queensland, Australia in 1990, when it emerged that scores of people had lost their jobs after a Brisbane-based personnel management company had given them poor OCA evaluations, "us[ing] such brutal terms they can read like character assassinations, leaving employers with little choice but to fire staff." The Australian Psychological Society denounced the OCA as "downright dangerous," commenting that

The Church of Scientology has reportedly been unable to produce information to substantiate the validity of the Oxford Capacity Analysis. This has attracted criticism from the Buros Institute of Mental Measurements in Lincoln, Nebraska, which produces the Mental Measurements Yearbook – the industry "bible" for psychological tests. According to the institute, "Any group should include information that substantiates the use of its test. If they can't, then it doesn't meet the standards for educational and psychological tests."

The OCA evaluators' criticism of their test subjects' personalities has also drawn sharp criticism. A London Evening Standard reporter described the unease she felt after she had taken the OCA test:

Psychologists have echoed this critique. The methodological flaws of the OCA were such that, in the view of Professor Gudmund Smith, "Analysis for evaluation of an individual is, in my opinion, manifestly unethical." Testifying in a court case in Ireland in 2003, Dr Declan Fitzgerald of University College Dublin said he believed that the OCA "impinged on people's self-esteem and was highly manipulative." In its 1970 report, the British Psychological Society's working party was even harsher with its criticism, declaring that

Even the name of the Oxford Capacity Analysis has been criticized as misleading. The Times comments that the test "has nothing to do with Oxford University" and says that "Scientologists use the word "Oxford" to give it credence."

See also
E-meter
Kaja Bordevich Ballo

Notes

External links

Article discusses a number of topics including origins of the OCA
John Foster's 1971 report on OCA
Online version of the OCA — Scientology.org
Operation Clambake presents Oxford Capacity Analysis
Scientology's Rigged OCA/Personality Test, Robert Vaughn Young
The Personality Test by Chris Owen

Scientology beliefs and practices
Personality tests
World Institute of Scientology Enterprises-affiliated organizations